Bernard Roman (born July 15, 1952 in Lille) was a member of the National Assembly of France.  He represented Nord's 1st constituency from 1997 to 2017, as a member of the Socialiste, radical, citoyen et divers gauche.

References

1952 births
Living people
Politicians from Lille
Politicians from Hauts-de-France
Socialist Party (France) politicians
Deputies of the 11th National Assembly of the French Fifth Republic
Deputies of the 12th National Assembly of the French Fifth Republic
Deputies of the 13th National Assembly of the French Fifth Republic
Deputies of the 14th National Assembly of the French Fifth Republic